Anthony David Harrington (born December 4, 1971) is an American R&B singer-songwriter. He is best known for his 2006 song "Words", a duet with contemporary R&B singer India.Arie.

Biography 
Anthony David was born in Savannah, Georgia, but got involved in the music business in Atlanta.  There, he met India.Arie, an R&B singer from Atlanta, and have since become friends. David's first song written for Arie was entitled "Part of My Life" for Arie's 7x Grammy nominated album Acoustic Soul. David also toured with Arie in support of her album.

In 2004, he released his first independent album Three Chords & The Truth. Alongside India.Arie, he opened up for her shows with songs from his album, thereby getting more fame. Then eventually in 2006, he released his second independent album The Red Clay Chronicles, of which also garnered attention from opening for India.Arie's shows. After touring with Arie, David teamed up with her once again to co-write and produce "There's Hope" for Arie's third studio album. His third release, 2008's Acey Duecy, is a combination of both R&B and soul music. The album, with the release of its first single "Words", a duet with Arie, has given the album more attention.

Anthony's fourth album, released on February 22, 2011, was entitled As Above So Below and finds him teaming up with a new production partner – Nashville, Tennessee's Shannon Sanders – in addition to such guest vocalists as upcoming Atlanta songstress Algebra; rapper Phonte from Little Brother; plus cousin Shawn Stockman of Boyz II Men. The first single from the album, "4Evermore" featuring Algebra and Phonte, became David's first top 20 R&B hit in the US charts where it has peaked at #18. In 2018, he released "Hello Like Before:  The Songs of Bill Withers" which pays tribute to the late great Bill Withers.  The album was produced by Eddie "Gypsy" Stokes.  Anthony's crooning, soulful sound brings to life the work of Bill Withers, again.

Discography

Singles 
"Something About You" (2006)
"Words" (2006) US R&B #53
"4Evermore" (2011) US R&B #18
"Can't Look Down" (2012)
"Sweet Pain" (2012)
"Beautiful Problems" (2016)

Awards and nominations 
Grammy Award
2009, Best R&B Performance by a Duo or Group with Vocals: "Words" (Nominated)
NAACP Image Award
2009, Outstanding New Artist (Nominated)
2009, Outstanding Duo or Group/Collaboration (Nominated)

Beliefs 
David is a self-described secular humanist and atheist. In 2011, he released a song and accompanying music video entitled God Said. The song criticizes how religionists try to justify bigotry and violence by invoking God and quoting scripture.

References

External links 

 Official website
 

American contemporary R&B singers
Musicians from Savannah, Georgia
Writers from Savannah, Georgia
Living people
American neo soul singers
1971 births
21st-century American guitarists
Guitarists from Georgia (U.S. state)
American male guitarists
African-American atheists
American atheists
African-American guitarists
21st-century African-American male singers